Dover is an unincorporated community in Lewis County, in the U.S. state of Missouri.

The community took its name from a nearby Baptist church of the same name.

References

Unincorporated communities in Lewis County, Missouri
Unincorporated communities in Missouri